The Central District of Najafabad County is a district (bakhsh) in Najafabad County, Isfahan province, Iran. At the 2006 census, its population was 254,672, in 67,106 families.  The district has four cities: Najafabad, Goldasht, Jowzdan, and Kahriz Sang. The district has three rural districts (dehestan): Jowzdan Rural District, Sadeqiyeh Rural District, and Safayyeh Rural District.

References 

Najafabad County
Districts of Isfahan Province